Urozercon is a genus of mites in the family Laelapidae.

Species
 Urozercon ishiharai (Kurosa, 1994)     
 Urozercon paradoxus Berlese, 1901

References

Laelapidae